Giulio Cabianca (19 February 1923 – 15 June 1961) was a Formula One driver from Italy.

Cabianca was born in Verona, northern Italy. He participated in 4 World Championship Grands Prix, debuting on 18 May 1958.  He scored a total of 3 championship points. He also participated in one non-Championship Formula One race. He also won the Dolomites Gold Cup Race in 1955.

Cabianca's death resulted from a bizarre incident at the Modena Autodrome test track in Italy. The Modena Autodrome was situated near Via Emilia, which crosses the city of Modena. Cabianca was testing a Cooper-Ferrari F1 car, owned by Scuderia Castellotti, when he suffered a suspected stuck throttle. Unable to stop, his Cooper went off track, struck a spectator and then went through the gate of the Autodrome which was open because of men at work near the track. The car crossed the Via Emilia and crashed against the wall of a workshop. Crossing the road, Cabianca's Cooper struck a taxi. Cabianca was killed as were the three people in the taxi.

Complete Formula One World Championship results
(key)

Non-Championship results
(key) (Races in bold indicate pole position)
(Races in italics indicate fastest lap)

References

 "The Grand Prix Who's Who", Steve Small, 1995

1923 births
1961 deaths
Sportspeople from Verona
Italian racing drivers
Italian Formula One drivers
OSCA Formula One drivers
Ecurie Bonnier Formula One drivers
24 Hours of Le Mans drivers
Racing drivers who died while racing
Sport deaths in Italy
World Sportscar Championship drivers